The following is a list of the transport undertakings transferred to the London Passenger Transport Board under the terms of the London Passenger Transport Act 1933. The transfer took a number of months as agreement had to be reached between the various operators and the board.

1 July 1933
Undertakings owned by the Underground Group:
The London Electric Railway Company
The Metropolitan District Railway Company
The Central London Railway Company
The City & South London Railway Company
The Lots Road Power House Joint Committee
The London General Omnibus Company, Limited
London General Country Services, Limited
Overground, Limited
The Tramways (M.E.T.) Omnibus Company, Limited
The Metropolitan Electric Tramways, Limited
The London United Tramways, Limited
The Union Surplus Lands Company, Limited
The Union Construction and Finance Company, Limited
Morden Station Garage, Limited
Acme Pullman Services, Limited
Bucks Expresses (Watford), Limited
Green Line Coaches, Limited.
Skylark Motor Coach Company, Limited
South Metropolitan Electric Tramways and Lighting Company, Limited (tramway and light railway undertaking only)
The Metropolitan Railway Company, (excluding the undertaking of the Surplus Lands Committee)
The following local authorities'  tramway, light railway or trolley vehicle undertakings:
The mayor, aldermen and burgesses of the borough of Barking
The Bexley Urban District Council
The mayor, aldermen and burgesses of the County Borough of Croydon
The mayor and commonalty and citizens of the City of London
The Dartford Urban District Council
The mayor, aldermen and burgesses of the County Borough of East Ham
The Erith Urban District Council
The Hertfordshire County Council
The mayor, aldermen and burgesses of the borough of Ilford
The mayor, aldermen and burgesses of the borough of Leyton
The London County Council
The Middlesex County Council
The mayor, aldermen and burgesses of the borough of Walthamstow
The mayor, aldermen and burgesses of the County Borough of West Ham
Thomas Tilling, Limited
Tilling and British Automobile Traction Company Limited

1 October 1933
Thomas Tilling Limited
Lewis Omnibus Company Limited

31 October 1933
Cardinal Omnibus Company, Limited
Chariot Omnibus Services, Limited
Filkins & Ainsworth, Limited.
Glen Omnibus Company (London), Limited
F. W. Hayes
F. J. C. Kirk.
Nelson Omnibus Company, Limited
A. H. Raper
Ryan Omnibus Company
F. Steer
Supreme Motor Omnibus Company, Limited
United Omnibus Company, Limited

9 November 1933
Convey and Clayton
Eagle Omnibus Company, Limited
Essex Omnibus Company, Limited
E. G. Hope
A. Mills
C. H. Pickup
Pro Bono Publico, Limited
Renown Traction Company, Limited
Charles Russett and Son

23 November 1933
Amersham and District Motor Bus and Haulage Company, Limited
Earl Motor Omnibus Company, Limited
E. Puttergill, Limited
F. A. Rasey
A. G. Summerskill, Limited
Triumph Motor Omnibus Company
Woolvett and Carswell

4 December 1933
G. H. Allitt and Sons, Limited
E. Brickwood, Limited
Cleveland Omnibus Company, Limited
Enterprise Transport Company, Limited
Holliday and Bangs
Peraeque Transport Company, Limited
Pioneer Omnibus Company

14 December 1933
B.B.P. Omnibus Company, Limited
Gordon Omnibus Company, Limited
Powell and Whybrow

20 December 1933
Premier Omnibus Company, Limited
Premier Line, Limited

1 February 1934
Empress Motors, Limited

14 February 1934
Red Rover Omnibus, Limited

21 February 1934
Birch Brothers, Limited

13 June 1934
Paterson Omnibus Company, Limited

11 July 1934
Westminster Omnibus Company, Limited

18 July 1934
St. George Omnibus Company, Limited

10 August 1934
Chocolate Express Omnibus Company, Limited

29 August 1934
Ambassador Bus Company, Limited
Sphere Omnibus Company, Limited
Miller Traction Company, Limited
Perkins Omnibus Company, Limited

7 November 1934
City Motor Omnibus Company, Limited
Reliance Omnibus Company, Limited
Victory Omnibus Company, Limited

5 December 1934
Prince Omnibus Company, Limited

References

History of transport in London
Passenger Transport Board